Arietha Emília Salles Corrêa (born 18 March 1977) is a Brazilian actress.

Biography 

Arietha Emília Salles Corrêa, also known and credited as Arieta Corrêa was born in the city of Botucatu, interior of São Paulo.

Present in more than 20 assembly is formed by the Research Center Theatre (CPT) Son of Ali with whom he worked for six years. With Antunes Filho, Arieta starred in shows such as Medea and Prêt-à-Porter 6.

Under the direction of Philip Hirsch, Arieta was in The Miser, highly praised assembly that marked the last appearance of the scenic actor Paulo Autran.

On television, was in the novels Explode Coração and O Rei do Gado, was in the miniseries and the Labirinto and A Casa das Sete Mulheres.

In the cinema in such films as Otávio e as Letras of Marcelo Masagão, and any man Caio Vecchio.

In 2008 Arieta was on display in the play with Leonardo Medeiros Não Sobre o Amor, and returned to television to participate in one of the episodes of the show Casos e Acasos, the Globo network. The following year participated in the Tudo Novo de Novo, also shown on TV Globo. In the same year he joined the cast of Novel Viver a Vida. The following year, the actress was on the big screen in the film Como Esquecer, directed by Malu de Martino and starring Ana Paula Arósio.

In 2011 made a cameo on the soap opera Insensato Coração. Also in 2011, was in the cast of VIPs.

Personal life 
In December 2008, the actress married actor Rodrigo Veronese, who has a son, Gael. After three months of marriage, she and Rodrigo separated.

Filmography

Television

Films

References

External links 

1977 births
Living people
Brazilian television actresses
Brazilian telenovela actresses
Brazilian film actresses
Brazilian stage actresses
People from Botucatu